The Gardens on Spring Creek is an 18-acre (72,843 m2) botanical garden located on the Spring Creek corridor in Fort Collins, Colorado. Located at 2145 Centre Avenue, the Gardens is owned and managed by the City of Fort Collins. A 501(c)(3) non-profit, volunteer board works in conjunction with the City of Fort Collins on behalf of the institution.

History
The idea for a community horticulture center in Fort Collins was vocalized as early as 1986, but the initial move to development can be traced to 1995 when the city of Fort Collins initiated a horticulture program. Groundbreaking for the visitor center took place in 2004, with the site opening later that year. 2017 saw the groundbreaking for a 5-acre, multi-million dollar expansion of garden spaces for the site. Lasting for two years, this expansion saw the addition of 5 new garden spaces: Theme (Plant Select, Fragrance, Rose, Moon, Hummingbird and Butterfly), Great Lawn/Everitt Pavilion, Undaunted, Foothills, and Prairie Gardens. Completed in 2019, the project doubled the visitor center's square footage and added an all-glass butterfly house operated in partnership with the Butterfly Pavilion of Westminster, CO.

Features

Current garden spaces
 Entryway Garden 
 Children's Garden (2006) 
 Xeric Parkway Strip (2006)
 Garden of Eatin' (2009) 
 Rock Garden (2010) 
 Wetlands Garden (2011)
 Sustainable Backyard (2013)
 The Great Lawn and Everitt Pavilion (2018)
 The Undaunted Garden (2018)
 Prairie Garden (2018)
 Foothills Garden (2018)
 Theme Gardens (2018): Plant Select® Garden, Fragrance Garden, Rose Garden, Moon Garden, and Hummingbird & Butterfly Garden
 Butterfly House (2019)
 Welcome Garden (2020)

See also
 List of botanical gardens in the United States

References

External links
 Official site

Botanical gardens in Colorado
Culture of Fort Collins, Colorado
Flora of Colorado